

People who were born at Toledo
This is a list of notable people who were born at Toledo, Spain.

Abd ar-Rahman II
Abū Ishāq Ibrāhīm al-Zarqālī
Alfonso Martínez de Toledo
Alfonso Salmeron
Alfonso X of Castile
Alonso Andrada
Álvarez de Paz
Ana González (fashion designer)
Anselmo Lorenzo
Beatriz Villacañas
Blas de Prado
Blas Piñar
Brunhilda of Austrasia
Diego de Covarubias y Leyva
Diego Duque de Estrada
Diego Ortiz
Elvira Moragas Cantarero
Emilio Esteban Infantes
Ferdinand II of León
Fernando Niño de Guevara
Francisco Cervantes de Salazar
Francisco de Amberes
Francisco de Rojas Zorrilla
Francisco de Vergara
Gabriel de Espinosa
Garcilaso de la Vega (poet)
Gustavo Morales
Feliciano López
Francisco del Rincón
Helladius of Toledo
Hernando de Talavera
Hernando de Ávila
Ibn al-Wafid
Ildefonsus
Isaac Israeli ben Joseph
Isaac Aboab of Castile
Isaac ibn Latif
Javier Lozano Cid
Jerónima de la Asunción
Joanna of Castile
Joey Kelly
Jorge Manuel Theotocópuli
José Díaz Morales
Juan Antonio Villacañas
Joseph Karo
Juan Alfon
Juan Castro (bishop)
Juan González de Mendoza
Judah Halevi
Juan López de Padilla
 Julian of Toledo
Luís Enrique Peñalver
Luis Quiñones de Benavente
Luis Tristán
Lucas Vázquez de Ayllón
Mark of Toledo
Nicolás de Vergara el Mozo
Pedro de Lagarto
Pedro de Ribadeneira
Pedro Laso de la Vega
Pedro Machuca
Peter of Toledo
Petrus Petri
Rahel la Fermosa
Ricardo Arredondo Calmache
Saint Marciana of Toledo
Sancho III of Castile
Tania (tango singer)
Todros ben Judah Halevi Abulafia
Tomás Barros Pardo

People who lived at Toledo
This is a list of notable people who had their main residence in Toledo during most of their life.
Abraham ibn Daud
Charles V, Holy Roman Emperor
El Greco
Judah ben Asher
Raymond de Sauvetât
Samuel ha-Levi

See also
Eleanor of Toledo

Spain